Yorgancioglu is a Turkish surname. Notable people with the surname include:

Özkan Yorgancıoğlu (born 1954), Turkish Cypriot politician
Selcuk Yorgancioglu (born 1967), Turkish businessman

Turkish-language surnames